Héctor Santiago Tapia Urdile (born 30 September 1977), also known as Tito Tapia, is a Chilean football manager and former player who played as a forward.

Career 
Tapia has played for Colo Colo, Universidad Católica, Palestino and Unión Española in Chile, Cruzeiro in Brazil, Lille OSC in France, Perugia in Italy and FC Thun in Switzerland.

In 2008 Tapia received an offer from Royal Excelsior Mouscron, but he decided to stay at La Católica.

In 2013 Tapia began his manager career at Colo-Colo.

On 2018 he coached Colo-Colo for the second time in his career.

International 
Tapia debuted for his country in 1997 and has 14 caps and 3 goals.

International goals

Honours

Player

Club
Colo-Colo
 Primera División de Chile (2): 1996, 1997 Clausura, 1998
 Copa Chile (1): 1996

Lille
 UEFA Intertoto Cup (1): 2004

Cruzeiro
 Campeonato Mineiro (1): 2004

International
Chile
 FIFA U-17 World Championship (1): Third Place 1993
 Football at the Summer Olympics Bronze Medal (1): 2000

Individual
Primera División de Chile Top-scorer (1): 2001

Manager
Colo-Colo
 Primera División de Chile (1): 2014 Clausura

References

External links
 
 Chile.com
 CBF 
 Héctor Tapia at Footballdatabase

Living people
1977 births
Footballers from Santiago
Chilean footballers
Chilean expatriate footballers
Chile international footballers
Chile youth international footballers
Chile under-20 international footballers
Olympic footballers of Chile
Footballers at the 2000 Summer Olympics
Medalists at the 2000 Summer Olympics
Olympic bronze medalists for Chile
Colo-Colo footballers
Club Deportivo Universidad Católica footballers
Club Deportivo Palestino footballers
Unión Española footballers
A.C. Perugia Calcio players
Lille OSC players
Cruzeiro Esporte Clube players
FC Thun players
Chilean Primera División players
Serie A players
Ligue 1 players
Campeonato Brasileiro Série A players
Swiss Super League players
Chilean expatriate sportspeople in Italy
Chilean expatriate sportspeople in France
Chilean expatriate sportspeople in Brazil
Chilean expatriate sportspeople in Switzerland
Expatriate footballers in Brazil
Expatriate footballers in France
Expatriate footballers in Italy
Expatriate footballers in Switzerland
Chilean football managers
Chilean expatriate football managers
Chilean Primera División managers
Peruvian Primera División managers
Primera B de Chile managers
Colo-Colo managers
Everton de Viña del Mar managers
Deportes Antofagasta managers
Coquimbo Unido managers
Expatriate football managers in Peru
Chilean expatriate sportspeople in Peru
Association football forwards
People from Santiago
Cusco FC managers